Västra Klagstorp was a locality situated in Malmö Municipality, Skåne County, Sweden with 279 inhabitants in 2010. By 2015 it was considered merged into Tygelsjö.

References 

Populated places in Malmö Municipality
Populated places in Skåne County
Neighbourhoods of Malmö